Ethanoligenens harbinense is a strictly anaerobic bacterium. It is Gram-positive, non-spore-forming, mesophilic and motile, its cells being regular rods (0.4–0.8×1.5–8.0 μm). Its type strain is YUAN-3T (=JCM 12961T =CGMCC 1.5033T).

References

Further reading

External links 
LPSN

Type strain of Ethanoligenens harbinense at BacDive -  the Bacterial Diversity Metadatabase

Eubacteriales
Bacteria described in 2006